Palaeodus is an extinct genus of thelodont agnathan that lived during the Lower Ordovician period near present-day Saint Petersburg, Russia.

References 

Agnatha
Prehistoric fish genera
Thelodonti